The Virginia Tech Rescue Squad (VTRS) is an emergency medical services (EMS) agency that serves the campus of Virginia Polytechnic Institute and State University. Founded in 1969, it is an all-volunteer, student-run organization that provides emergency medical service to the University community. Virginia Tech Rescue Squad maintains four advanced life support ambulances, a first response vehicle, a command vehicle, a John Deere gator 4x4 special response vehicle and a special operations truck with in-station crews ready for service 24 hours a day 7 days a week. The crew also maintains a Mass Casualty Incident (MCI) Response Trailer and a Mobile Utility and Logistics Equipment (MULE) trailer.

The agency responds to an average of 1,200 calls per year and provides stand-by emergency medical services for large events on the campus of Virginia Tech, including home football games held in Lane Stadium.

It is the second oldest student-run volunteer EMS agency in the nation behind Saint Michael's Fire & Rescue, as well as the first provider of Advanced life support in the Montgomery County, Virginia area.

References

External links 
 

Emergency medical services in the United States
Organizations established in 1969
Virginia Tech
Medical and health organizations based in Virginia